Archbishopric of Cashel may refer to:

 Catholic
 the present Roman Catholic Archdiocese of Cashel and Emly, with see in Thurles
 the former Catholic (pre-reformation) Archdiocese of Cashel, with pre-Reformation see in Thurles, which merged with the Roman Catholic Diocese of Emly into the above

 Anglican
 the former archdiocese of the Church of Ireland which was demoted to Diocese of Cashel and Ossory

See also 
 Archbishop of Cashel, list of archiepiscopal incumbents by succession line